Wanda Jarszewska (3 November 1888 – 15 May 1964) was a Polish film actress. She appeared in more than 40 films between 1916 and 1962.

Selected filmography
 The Adventures of Anton (1913)
 Pan Twardowski (1921)
 Księżna Łowicka (1932)
 Dvanáct křesel (1933)
 Prokurator Alicja Horn (1933)
 Zabawka (1933)
 Love, Cherish, Respect (1934)
 Police Chief Antek (1935)
 Będzie lepiej (1936)
 30 karatów szczęścia (1936)
 Augustus the Strong (1936)
 Znachor (1937)
 A Diplomatic Wife (1937)
 Niedorajda (1937)
 Second Youth (1938)
 Doctor Murek (1939)

References

External links

1888 births
1964 deaths
Polish film actresses
Polish silent film actresses
Actresses from Warsaw
People from Warsaw Governorate
Polish stage actresses
20th-century Polish actresses